Peter Biggs was the senior special effects technician for the movie Who Framed Roger Rabbit and a number of  Hollywood films during the 1980s.

Filmography
 A Kiss Before Dying (1991) – Special effects technician
 Who Framed Roger Rabbit (1988) – Senior special effects
 Labyrinth (1986) – Special effects technician
 Supergirl (1984) – Special effects technician
 Krull (1983) – Special effects technician
 Superman (1978) – Special effects technician
 2001 Space Odyssey (1965)

References

External links
 

Possibly living people
Special effects people
Year of birth missing (living people)